Carmen Hart (born March 12, 1984) is a Native American former pornographic actress and exotic dancer from North Carolina.

Career
Hart attributes the 1996 Demi Moore movie Striptease as her inspiration to begin exotic dancing. Hart drove to Fayetteville one night and stopped at the first strip club she saw.

In October 2005, Hart signed on as a contract girl with Wicked Pictures for two years. Over the course of her career Hart predominantly worked for the production company Wicked Pictures, but she also worked for companies such as Adam & Eve and New Sensations. During her career, Hart did not perform any anal scenes.

Over the course of her adult industry career, Hart continued to be featured as a dancer in men's clubs as well as appear at modeling shows and conventions in the United States and abroad.

Appearances
Hart has appeared on several television shows that include several multi-episode roles. These appearances include the Netherland talk show Spuiten en slikken in 2007,  the G4 network series Rated A for Adult in 2010, plus roles in the comedy series Totally Busted (nine episodes) and Canoga Park (two episodes).

In March 2007 Hart made an appearance at the 56th Annual Miss USA Pageant at the Hollywood Kodak Theatre. She was the current Miss Exotic International title holder and watched as controversial Miss USA 2006 Tara Conner crowned her successor, Rachel Smith. Hart was also spotted with celebrity judge Vanessa Minnillo and event producer Donald Trump. Later she made a guest appearance on the Los Angeles-based syndicated KROQ FM radio show Loveline.

In May 2007 Hart was featured on the cover of Strip Las Vegas magazine. Later in November Hart was featured along with pornographic actress Tera Patrick in the 100th issue of GlamorGirl magazine.

Awards and nominations

Awards
2007 AVN Award – Best Group Sex Scene, Film – Fuck
 2007 Adam Film World Guide Award – Contract Starlet of the Year – Wicked Pictures
2007 Venus Award – Best International Newcomer

Nominations
2007 AVN Award – Best Supporting Actress, Film – Manhunters
2008 AVN Award – Best Actress – Video – Just Between Us
2008 XBIZ Award – Female Performer of the Year
2009 AVN Award – Best Actress – Fired

Personal life
Hart grew up in a Christian home, but she says that her family was not very strict.

References

External links

 
 
 

1984 births
Living people
American female erotic dancers
American erotic dancers
American pornographic film actresses
People from Lumberton, North Carolina
Pornographic film actors from North Carolina
Native American pornographic film actors
21st-century American women